Several Shades of Why is the debut solo studio album by Dinosaur Jr frontman J Mascis, released March 15, 2011 on Sub Pop Records.

Track listing

Bonus tracks

Personnel
J Mascis – vocals, guitar
Kurt Vile – vocals, dobro, guitar, optigan, piano, saw, slide guitar
Pall Jenkins – vocals, lap steel, optigan, piano, saw
Kevin Drew – vocals, clarinet
Ben Bridwell – vocal
Suzanne Thorpe  – flute
Sophie Trudeau – violin
Kurt Fedora  – guitar
Matt Valentine – guitar

References

2011 albums
J Mascis albums
Sub Pop albums